Aberrasine aberrans is a moth in the family Erebidae first described by Arthur Gardiner Butler in 1877. It is found in China (Heilongjiang, Jilin, Beijing, Shaanxi, Henan, Jiangsu, Zhejiang, Jiangxi, Fujian, Hubei, Hunan, Sichuan, Guangxi, Guangdong, Hainan), Korea, Russia, Japan and Taiwan.

The wingspan is 17–26 mm. Adults are day flying and are on wing in March.

Subspecies
Miltochrista aberrans aberrans
Miltochrista aberrans okinawana (Matsumura, 1930) (Japan)

References

Moths described in 1877
Moths of Asia